His Orchestra, His Chorus, His Singers, His Sound is the only number-one album in the UK for American bandleader and trombonist Ray Conniff. It spent three weeks at the top of the chart in 1969.

Track listing
"Memories Are Made of This"
"I've Got You Under My Skin"
"Volare"
"They Can't Take You Away from Me"
"Greenfields"
"Melodie D'Amour"
"Days of Wine and Roses"
"Spanish Eyes"
"Somewhere My Love"
"Mrs. Robinson"
"Up Up and Away"

References

1969 albums
Ray Conniff albums